Juan Nicolas Jarvis Ocana (born December 6, 1950 in Guantanamo, Cuba) is a former Cuban athlete. He is the fourth son of Esther Ocana Nolasco and  Teodoro Jarvis.

Competing as a javelin thrower for more than 10 years, he participated in many international competitions as a part of the Cuban national team. At the 1971 Central American and Caribbean Championships in Athletics he won the gold medal. He won silver at both the 1974 Central American and Caribbean Games and the 1975 Pan American Games, and gold once again at the 1977 Central American and Caribbean Championships in Athletics.

References

1950 births
Living people
Athletes (track and field) at the 1971 Pan American Games
Athletes (track and field) at the 1975 Pan American Games
Cuban male javelin throwers
Sportspeople from Guantánamo
Pan American Games medalists in athletics (track and field)
Pan American Games silver medalists for Cuba
Central American and Caribbean Games silver medalists for Cuba
Competitors at the 1974 Central American and Caribbean Games
Central American and Caribbean Games medalists in athletics
Medalists at the 1975 Pan American Games